Labedella gwakjiensis is a Gram-positive, rod-shaped and non-motile bacterium from the genus Labedella which has been isolated from dried seaweed from the coast of Jeju Island in Korea.

References

Microbacteriaceae
Bacteria described in 2007